The 2018–19 Dartmouth Big Green women's basketball team represented Dartmouth College during the 2018–19 NCAA Division I women's basketball season. The Big Green, led by sixth year head coach Belle Koclanes, played their home games at Leede Arena and were members of the Ivy League. They finished the season at 13–14, 6–8 to finish in a 3 way tie for fourth place. Due to a tie breaker loss to Cornell and Yale they failed to qualify for the Ivy League women's tournament.

Roster

Schedule

|-
!colspan=9 style=| Non-conference regular season

|-
!colspan=9 style=| Ivy League regular season

See also
 2018–19 Dartmouth Big Green men's basketball team

References

Dartmouth Big Green women's basketball seasons
Dartmouth
Dartmouth Big Green women's
Dartmouth